Chongor or Changar may refer to:
 Chongor-e Jalilvand
 Chongor-e Saminvand